"Bloke" is a song performed by Australian comedian Chris Franklin, released as a parody of Meredith Brooks's song "Bitch" with the lyrics changed to reflect the stereotypical Australian male lifestyle. It debuted at number 15 on the Australian Singles Chart before eventually reaching the number-one spot and staying there for two weeks, becoming the 12th-highest-selling single of the year. It received a platinum certification from the Australian Recording Industry Association for shipments of over 70,000. The song was later nominated for two ARIA Award for Best Comedy Release and ARIA Award for Highest Selling Single.

Awards and nominations

|+ Awards and nominations for "Bloke"
| rowspan="2" | 2000
| rowspan="2" | ARIA Music Awards of 2000
| Highest Selling Single
| 
|-
| Best Comedy Release
| 
|}

Track listing
Australian CD single
 "Bloke" – 3:50
 "Jack Off Australia" – 2:13

Credits and personnel
Credits are lifted from the Australian CD single liner notes.

Studio
 Recorded at Espy Records (St Kilda, Victoria)

Personnel

 Chris Franklin – vocals, lyrics, production
 Meredith Brooks – music ("Bitch")
 Shelly Peiken – music ("Bitch")
 Gavin Charles – programming, arrangement, production
 James Lomas – guitar, vocals

 Fiona Lee – bass, vocals
 Crib Point Football Club 2nd 18 Choir – additional backing vocals
 James "Oyster" Kilpatrick – engineering, production
 Rod Stead – cover artwork
 Gavin Hansford – photography

Charts

Weekly charts

Year-end charts

Certifications

References

2000 debut singles
2000 songs
EMI Records singles
Musical parodies
Songs about Australia
Songs written by Meredith Brooks
Songs written by Shelly Peiken